Monsit Khamsoi (born 30 April 1964) is a Thai singer.

Early life
His birth name is Boontheng Kaewseenuan. He was born in Mukdahan Province. He is the son of Noola-Yun Kaewseenuan. Since his family was poor, he completed Primary 4,and then went to work in Bangkok.

Career
He met DJ Monrak Klinbupha, who took him to many labels, but this did not happen. In 1995, he worked as a singer of Sure Entertainment and recorded his first studio album Khai Kwai Chuai Mae, and in 1996, his second album Sang Nang, which was successful. Songs from this album were covered by entertainers such as Jod Mai Phid Song.

In 2013 he came out as gay.

Discography
1995 – "Khai Kwai Chuai Mae" (ขายควายช่วยแม่)
1996 – "Sang Nang" (สั่งนาง)
1997 – "Kid Tueng Jang Loey" (คิดถึงจังเลย)
1998 – "Ko Sam Phi" (โกสัมพี)
1999 – "Kam Lang Jai" (กำลังใจ)
2001 – "Dok Mai Hai Khoon" (ดอกไม้ให้คุณ)
2002 – "Pha Poo Tieang" (ผ้าปูเตียง)
2007 – "Rong Siea Hai Phoe" (ร้องเสียให้พอ)

References

1964 births
Living people
Monsit Khamsoi
Monsit Khamsoi
Monsit Khamsoi
Monsit Khamsoi